Asheville Transfer and Storage Company Building is a historic warehouse located at Asheville, Buncombe County, North Carolina. It was built in 1929, and is a three-story, eight bay, Art Deco style reinforced concrete building.  It features receding stepped brick panels on either side of the main entrance and a patterned brick parapet.

It was listed on the National Register of Historic Places in 1979.

References

External links

Commercial buildings on the National Register of Historic Places in North Carolina
Art Deco architecture in North Carolina
Commercial buildings completed in 1929
Buildings and structures in Asheville, North Carolina
National Register of Historic Places in Buncombe County, North Carolina